A milkshake is a beverage typically made with blended milk and ice cream.

Milkshake may also refer to:

 "Milkshake", by Village People from Can't Stop the Music, 1980
 "Milkshake" (song), a 2003 song by Kelis
 Milkshake (EP), an EP by Jaws
 Milkshake!, a British children's programming block on Channel 5
 Milkshake (band), an American band nominated for a Grammy Award for Best Musical Album for Children in 2010
 Thee Milkshakes, a UK punk band founded by Billy Childish
 Milk Shakes (Washington), a mountain in the state of Washington, in the US
 MilkShake, a girl group from Thailand